Bruce Manson and Brian Teacher were the defending champions but only Manson competed that year with Rick Leach.

Leach and Manson lost in the first round to Rolf Gehring and Shlomo Glickstein.

Brian Gottfried and Raúl Ramirez won in the final 6–4, 3–6, 6–2 against John Lloyd and Dick Stockton.

Seeds

Draw

Final

Top half

Bottom half

References
 1982 Congoleum Classic Doubles Draw

Congoleum Classic Doubles